Salma may refer to:

People
 Salma (given name), a list of people
 Happy Salma (born 1980), Indonesian actress
 Salma (writer), pen name of Indian Tamil writer, activist and politician born Rajathi Samsudeen in 1968
 Abu Salma, Palestinian poet and PLO member Abd al-Karim al-Karmi (1909–1980)

Places
 Salma, Nepal, a former village development committee
 Salma, Syria, a village
 Salma Mountains, Saudi Arabia

Other uses
 Salma (moth), a moth genus in the subfamily Epipaschiinae
 Salma Dam, a dam in Afghanistan
 South American land mammal age (SALMA), a geologic timescale term
 Salma (film), a 1985 Indian drama musical romance film directed by Ramanand Sagar
 Salma, a 2013 documentary by Kim Longinotto

See also
 
 
 Selma (disambiguation)
 Salmas, Iran, a city